Denis Loktev (born 4 June 2000) is an Israeli swimmer. He competes in 100 m freestyle, 100 m medley, 200 m freestyle, 400 m freestyle, 4x100 m freestyle, 4x100m freestyle mixed, 4x200 m freestyle, 4x200 m freestyle, and 4x50 m freestyle. He won a bronze medal at the 2018 Youth Olympic Games in the men's 200 m freestyle, as well as the 2018 European Junior Swimming Championship in the men's 4x200 m freestyle.

Swimming career
He competes in 100 m freestyle, 100 m medley, 200 m freestyle, 400 m freestyle, 4x100 m freestyle, 4x100m freestyle mixed, 4x200 m freestyle, 4x200 m freestyle, and 4x50 m freestyle.

In July 2016, he won a bronze medal at the 2016 European Junior Swimming Championships  in Hódmezővásárhely, Hungary, in the men's 4x200 m freestyle. In June 2017, he won a bronze medal at the 2017 European Junior Swimming Championships in Netanya, Israel, in the men's 4x200 m freestyle. In July 2017 at the 2017 Maccabiah Games he won the gold medal in the men’s 200 m freestyle.

In July 2018, he won a gold medal at the 2018 European Junior Swimming Championships in Helsinki, Finland, in the men's 4x200 m freestyle, and a silver medal in the men's 200 m freestyle with a 1:47.95. In October 2018 he won a bronze medal at the 2018 Youth Olympic Games in the men's 200 m freestyle.

In March 2019, he won the men’s 400 m freestyle with a 3:52.40 at the 2019 Fédération Française de Natation Golden Tour Camille Muffat in Marseille, France. In April 2019, he set a new Israeli national record in the 400 m freestyle with a 3:51.45 at the Stockholm Open. The same month he won a silver medal at the Israel Cup in the 200 m freestyle, with a 1:48.47. In May 2019 at the 2019 Speedo Grand Challenge in Irvine, California, he won a silver medal in the 400 m freestyle super-final, at 3:54.50. In July 2019 he competed in the men's 400 metre freestyle at the 2019 World Aquatics Championships.

See also
List of Israeli records in swimming
Israel at the Youth Olympics

References

External links
 
 
 
 
 
 

2000 births
Living people
Israeli male swimmers
Place of birth missing (living people)
Swimmers at the 2018 Summer Youth Olympics
Competitors at the 2017 Maccabiah Games
Maccabiah Games medalists in swimming
Maccabiah Games gold medalists for Israel
Swimmers at the 2020 Summer Olympics
Olympic swimmers of Israel
21st-century Israeli people